Lau Lauritzen Sr., born  Lauritz Lauritzen (13 March 1878, in Silkeborg – 2 July 1938) was an early Danish film director, screenwriter and actor of the silent era in Denmark. His son, Lau Lauritzen Jr. became one of Denmark's leading directors in the 1940s and 1950s.

Filmography

As an actor

As a director

External links

1878 births
1938 deaths
Place of death missing
People from Silkeborg
Danish male film actors
Danish male silent film actors
20th-century Danish male actors
Silent film directors
Danish film directors
Danish male screenwriters
20th-century screenwriters
Burials at Hellerup Cemetery